Klayton Adams (born February 13, 1983) is an American football coach who is the offensive line coach for the Arizona Cardinals of the National Football League (NFL). He previously served as an assistant coach at the University of Colorado Boulder, San Jose State University, Sacramento State University, Western Washington University, Boise State University, and Indianapolis Colts.

Playing career
Adams initially played junior college football at American River College near his hometown Sacramento and initially wanted to convert to linebacker but was persuaded not to by his coach. He proceeded to walk-on at Boise State where he was named a second team All-WAC selection his senior year.

Coaching career

Early career
Upon the conclusion of his playing career at Boise State, Adams began his coaching career at his alma mater as graduate assistant in 2005. He went on to coach at Western Washington as the run game coordinator and offensive line coach until the football program was shut down in 2008. He also had stints coaching at Sacramento State and San Jose State.

Colorado
Following the hire of San Jose State head coach Mike MacIntyre as the head coach at Colorado, Adams joined his coaching staff as the running backs and tight ends coach. He was shifted to offensive line coach in 2016, and later added the title of co-offensive coordinator ahead of the 2018 season.

Indianapolis Colts
Initially taking a position at Wyoming as their offensive line coach, Adams left to become the assistant offensive line coach for the Indianapolis Colts in 2019. After initially joining the Arizona State coaching staff in 2021, Adams opted to return to the Colts as their tight ends coach.

Arizona Cardinals
The Cardinals hired Adams as their offensive line coach on February 20, 2023. Adams had originally accepted a coaching position with the  Stanford Cardinal but chose instead to accept an offer from the Arizona Cardinals to become their offensive line coach.

References

External links
 Arizona Cardinals profile
 Indianapolis Colts profile
 Colorado profile

1983 births
Living people
American football centers
Arizona Cardinals coaches
Arizona State Sun Devils football coaches
Boise State Broncos football coaches
Boise State Broncos football players
Coaches of American football from California
Colorado Buffaloes football coaches
Indianapolis Colts coaches
Players of American football from Sacramento, California
Sacramento State Hornets football coaches
San Jose State Spartans football coaches
Western Washington Vikings football coaches
Wyoming Cowboys football coaches